Malabo Kings BC is an Equatorial Guinean basketball club based in Malabo. The team was founded in 2011 and has won the national title twice. 

In its history, Malabo Kings has made three appearances in the FIBA Africa Club Champions Cup: in 2011, 2013 and 2014. During the 2014 season, the Kings were sanctioned by FIBA Africa for fraud with the identity of two players, and were given two technical losses.

History 
The Malabo Kings played their first game on February 25, 2011.

Honours
Liga Nacional de Baloncesto

 Champions (2): 

FIBA Africa Zone IV
Champions (3): 2013
Copa de su Excalencia

 Winners (1):

In African competitions
FIBA Africa Clubs Champions Cup (3 appearances)
2011 – 12th Place
2013 – 7th Place
2014 – Preliminary Round

BAL Qualifiers (1 appearance)
2022 – Withdrew

References

External links
Official Twitter
Malabo Kings at AfroBasket.com

Basketball teams in Equatorial Guinea
Basketball teams established in 2011
Sport in Malabo